Clement Byrne Christesen (28 October 1911 – 28 June 2003) was the founder of the Australian literary magazine Meanjin. He served as the magazine's editor from 1940 until 1974.

Biography

Early years
Clement Byrne Christesen was born and spent his early life in Townsville. His father, Patrick, was of mixed Irish and Danish descent, while his mother Susan (née Byrne), was mostly Irish. The family moved to Brisbane in 1917, where Christesen later attended the University of Queensland.

Career
After leaving university, Christesen worked as a journalist at Brisbane's Courier-Mail and the Telegraph, as well as a publicity officer for the Queensland government.

Christesen was founding editor of Meanjin Papers which was first published in 1940, following his return from overseas travel.

With an offer of full-time salary and commercial support for the publication, the magazine and its editor moved to the University of Melbourne in 1945.

He retired as editor in 1974.

Personal life

In January 1942, he married Nina Maximoff, only daughter of Captain and Mrs. Michael Maximoff of South Brisbane, Queensland. Nina Christesen would found the Russian Department at the University of Melbourne.  In the 1940s they moved to "Stanhope" in Eltham, Victoria.

Awards
Christesen was granted several awards and state honours in recognition of his achievements:
 Officer of the Order of British Empire, 1 January 1962, In recognition of service to Australian literature
 Medal of the Order of Australia, 26 January 2000, for service to the development of Australian creative and critical writing as founder and editor of Meanjin Quarterly
 Centenary Medal, 1 January 2001, for service to Australian society and the humanities in writing and literature

Bibliography

 
 The Hand of Memory : Selected Stories and Verse, Meanjin Press, 1970, 
 The Troubled Eyes of Women, University of Queensland Press, 1990, 

As editor
 Australian Heritage : Selection of Australian writings accompanied by brief introductions, chosen to show the relationship between writers and social history, Longmans, 1949, 1962, 1967
 On Native Grounds : Australian writing from Meanjin quarterly, Selected with a preface by C.B. Christesen, Angus and Robertson, 1968

Death
Christesen died on 28 June 2003 at Templestowe nursing home two years after his wife's death. "He was lucid right to the end," said his niece Nina Joan Christesen.

Notes

References

 
 
 
Clem Christessen 1911–2003 at Australian Academy of the Humanities

1911 births
2003 deaths
Australian people of Danish descent
Australian people of Irish descent  
Australian literary critics
Meanjin people
Officers of the Order of the British Empire
People from Townsville
Recipients of the Centenary Medal
Recipients of the Medal of the Order of Australia